Nightfall is an album led by drummer Louis Hayes which was recorded in 1991 and released on the Danish SteepleChase label.

Track listing 
 "Route 88 East" (Eddie Allen) – 4:36
 "Sun Showers" (Clint Houston) – 8:35
 "Nightfall" (Larry Willis) – 7:48
 "Marie Antoinette" (Wayne Shorter) – 9:13
 "There's Something About You I Don't Know" (Louis Hayes) – 10:47
 "André" (John Stubblefield) – 5:51
 "I Waited for You" (Gil Fuller, Dizzy Gillespie) – 10:30
 "The Spoiler" (Allen) – 6:21

Personnel 
Louis Hayes – drums
Eddie Allen – trumpet
Gerald Hayes – alto saxophone
Larry Willis – piano
Clint Houston – bass

References 

Louis Hayes albums
1991 albums
SteepleChase Records albums